Ronaldus Shamask (born November 24, 1945) is an American fashion designer.

Biography
Ronaldus Shamask was born in Amsterdam, Netherlands and raised in Australia. He was trained as an architect and is self-taught in fashion design. He started his professional career a window display designer in Melbourne (1963–1966). He went on to become a fashion illustrator for The Times and The Observer in London, England from 1967 to 1968.

From 1968 to 1971 Shamask was a theatrical designer for the Company of Man performance group in Buffalo, New York. He worked as a freelance interior and clothing designer between 1971 and 1977. In 1978–1990 he formed a partnership with Murray Moss and formed the Moss Shamask Fashion Company in New York. He went on to design many more clothes. Ronaldus has won several awards since then.

Awards 
 American Fashion Critics Coty Award in 1981
 Council of Fashion Designers of America Award in 1987
 Confédération Internationale du Lin Fil d'Or Award in 1989
 Woolmark Award in 1989

External links
Shamask Official Home Page
article discussing Shamask's partnership with Murray Moss
FashionEncyclopedia.com profile

1945 births
Living people
American fashion designers
Designers from Amsterdam